10 O'Clock Live is a British comedy/news television programme that ran from 2011 to 2013, presented by Charlie Brooker, Jimmy Carr, Lauren Laverne and David Mitchell.

The programme was commissioned following the success of Channel 4's Alternative Election Night, fronted by the same four presenters, in May 2010. The first series appeared in 2011, with two subsequent series broadcast in 2012 and 2013. In October 2014 it was confirmed that the show would not be continuing.

The song "Bernie" by the Jon Spencer Blues Explosion was used for the show's theme.

Interactivity
The show had official Facebook and Twitter pages to enable viewer interactivity whilst live on air. Polls were run via the Facebook page and comments received via both pages and read out by the presenters.

Format

First series
The show was introduced by the four hosts positioned, seated or standing, around an island table. In an order that changed with each show, they would each introduce themselves by name, with the last host to speak also introducing the show ("It's 10 o'clock, we're live on Channel 4, this is 10 O'Clock Live..."). The hosts would then sit down at another table and open the show on an introductory discussion and set-up to the planned topics for the week's show. This was always followed by Jimmy Carr explaining the news of the week in the form of one-liner jokes, then by Charlie Brooker examining the way in which an event, story or media-figure has been covered in the news, focusing his satire on the way the event was covered to the public. He did the same again later on, normally on a different subject (for example, if he covered a political story earlier on, he will examine coverage of a celebrity later). David Mitchell always had three sections: a panel-discussion with guests (such as journalists, activists, and MPs) discussing an issue; an interview with a more well-known or higher-ranking political figure, which he aimed to conduct as seriously as possible, but was able to satirize what the interviewee says unlike more serious political interviewers; and a "Listen to Mitchell" section, in the style of his panel-show rants and David Mitchell's Soapbox podcast series. Carr also had two more sections to himself in the style of one-liner stand-up, but usually while satirically playing a character or figure from the news, (such as George Osborne during the week of the 2011 United Kingdom budget). Lauren Laverne tended to introduce pre-recorded sketches and material, and chair the discussions amongst the four hosts.

Second and third series
The shows from the second and third series had a slightly shorter running time than those in the first. As such, a few items were subsequently dropped: the self-introduction of each host by name (after the credits the camera cut straight to the table where the four were seated for the initial discussion, always chaired by Laverne); David Mitchell's one-to-one political interviews were removed, while his "Listen to Mitchell" segment only appeared in one episode; Charlie Brooker's sardonic takes on news stories were reduced from two to one; Lauren Laverne's pre-recorded sketches were replaced with "Lauren Laverne's Occasional Guide to...", in which she delivered a satirical "guide" to various current events, such as the 2012 Republican presidential primaries or the UK government's expenditure for the Cultural Olympiad.

Episodes and guests

Series 1

Series 2

Series 3

Viewing figures 
BARB as reported by The Guardian, recorded overnight viewing figures demonstrating that the show "launched with 1.373 million viewers and a 7.8% audience share, with about another 100,000 watching an hour later on Channel 4 +1", running against BBC One's popular and well established weekly political debate programme, Question Time which had ratings slightly better than the week before. Channel 4 claimed that the show nevertheless drew a higher share of the 16-34 demographic. The Guardian'''s reporter also remarked that Newsnight, BBC Two's flagship nightly current affairs programme, suffered its lowest audience of the past year. The BBC programmes overlap the 22:00–23:05 timeslot filled by 10 O'Clock Live.

In the second week, ratings were down to 1.084 million viewers, representing a 6% audience share.

Overnights for the show on 7 April had figures at 610,000 (3.6%) with a further 110,000 (1.2%) one hour later on the timeshifted Channel 4+1.

Reception
In Metro on 11 February 2011, Christopher Hooton wrote that the show had become "a much-improved animal with several stand-out funny moments", but also claimed it had become "as overtly partisan as Fox News".

A number of commentators noted that the first series of show was consistently biased towards a left-wing stance on political issues. In The Daily Telegraph Robert Colvile strongly criticised the quality of the humour in the programme, describing it as an "insular, disjointed, murderously unfunny smug-a-thon", while in the same newspaper James Delingpole saw an overt liberal left bias in the programme.

Others have criticised the apolitical nature of the programme's comedy. Reviewing the opening episode of the second series on The Huffington Post'', Richard Berry argued that the programme failed to live up to its billing as satire, commenting "More often than not, in 10 O'Clock Live politics and current affairs are referenced merely as a backdrop for toilet humour."

References

External links

2011 British television series debuts
2013 British television series endings
2010s British satirical television series
Channel 4 comedy
English-language television shows
Television series by Endemol
Television series by Zeppotron
British live television series